The Compilation of the Messages and Papers of the Presidents is an eleven-volume series comprising proclamations, special messages, and inauguration speeches from several presidents throughout United States history.  There are ten numbered volumes each covering a set of presidents between the years of 1787 and 1902 and an eleventh index volume.  

The initial set was copyrighted in 1897 by James D. Richardson, a representative from the state of Tennessee, and was published in 1911, by the Bureau of National Literature and Art. The private copyright of these public documents became a political dispute known as the Richardson Affair and copyright of such works was prohibited in 1895, eventually leading to a comprehensive prohibition on copyright of works of the federal government. 

There is also a supplement version that covers individual presidents in depth and was published, also by the Bureau of National Literature, but in 1917.  A typical volume has the Seal of the President emblazoned in the front and the back.
The original first edition was printed in 1899 by the Government Printing office in Washington D.C.  Only 6,000 copies were printed and presented to members of Congress and the Senate for reference. Two thousand for the use of the Senate and four thousand for the use of Congress. In 1911, there was a third printing and contained 20 volumes. There was no eleventh volume in the first printing. The index is contained in the tenth volume. These volumes are brown and have no seal.

Contents

Volume one
The original first edition was printed in 1899 by the Government Printing office in Washington D.C.  Only 6,000 copies were printed and presented to members of Congress and Senate. Two thousand for the use of the Senate and four thousand for the use of Congress. In 1911, there was a third printing and contained 20 volumes. There was no eleventh volume in the first printing. The index is contained in the tenth volume. These volumes are brown and have no seal.

The first edition of the series was first presented to Congress and the press on May 1, 1896, to much public acclaim.  On May 22, Congress ordered 15,000 copies of the publication to be printed and distributed among the general public.  It covers the terms of George Washington, John Adams, Thomas Jefferson, and James Madison between 1797 and 1817.

Volume two
Volume Two covers the presidential terms of James Monroe, John Quincy Adams, Andrew Jackson, and a little of Martin Van Buren.  The Treasury Department at Washington, D.C. is illustrated as the frontispiece and includes the portraits of John Quincy Adams, Andrew Jackson, and Martin Van Buren.

Volume three
Volume Three finishes the office of Andrew Jackson and covers the term of Martin Van Buren.  These occur between 1837 and 1841.

Volume four IV

 Part 1: William Henry Harrison, March 4 to April 4, 1841
 Part 2: John Tyler, April 4, 1841 to March 4, 1845
 Part 3: James K. Polk, March 4, 1845 to March 4, 1849

Volume five V

 Parts 1 and 2: Zachary Taylor, March 5, 1849 to July 9, 1850, and Millard Fillmore, July 10, 1850 to March 4, 1853
 Part 3: Franklin Pierce, March 4, 1853 to March 4, 1857
 Part 4: James Buchanan, March 4, 1857 to March 4, 1861

Volume six VI

 Part 1: Abraham Lincoln, March 4, 1861 to April 15, 1865
 Part 2: Andrew Johnson, April 15, 1865 to March 4, 1869

Volume seven VII

 Part 1: Ulysses S. Grant, March 4, 1869 to March 4, 1877
 Part 2: Rutherford B. Hayes, March 4, 1877 to March 4, 1881

Volume eight VIII

 Part 1: James A. Garfield: March 14 to September 19, 1881
 Part 2: Chester A. Arthur, September 19, 1881 to March 4, 1885
 Part 3: Grover Cleveland, March 4, 1885 to March 4, 1889

Volume nine lX

 Part 1: Benjamin Harrison, March 4, 1889 to March 4, 1893
 Part 2: Grover Cleveland, March 4, 1893 to March 4, 1897

Volume ten X

 Part 1: Messages, Proclamations, Etc., Omitted From Volumes I to IX
 Part 2: William McKinley: Messages, Proclamations, and Executive Orders Relating to the Spanish–American War

 Supplemental Volume:

 Part 1: William McKinley, March 4, 1897 to September 14, 1901: Additional Messages, Proclamations, Executive Orders, and Last Public Utterance to the People at Buffalo
 Part 2: Theodore Roosevelt: Messages, Proclamations, and Executive Orders to the End of the Fifty-seventh Congress, First Session

References

External links

Messages and Papers of the Presidents

United States presidential history
Books about presidents of the United States